Piers Baron (born 29 October 1983) is an English musician and record producer, he has written for David Blaine, Robbie Williams, DJ Fresh, Pendulum, Diane Warren, Glen Ballard, Maejor, Gran Turismo Sport, HBO, Jetman - "Young Feathers", Nike - "Never Not Part 2", and Cher. He is best known for his cinematic music production, particularly in drum and bass, soundtracks and pop.

Career

Drum and bass
Producing music under the name "Baron", he joined up with Breakbeat Kaos and was known for dance-floor tracks, releasing "At the Drive In". His drum and bass records were featured on BBC Radio 1, and were successful on UK dance charts, with  a number one hit, seven top tens and six top three hits. He scored a number 1 on the UK Dance Chart with his track "Drive In, Drive By"."Operation Pipe Dream" by Baron has been cited by Skrillex as the driving force to him becoming a DJ.

Soundtrack
Baron has worked extensively in the soundtrack genre. His credits include Gran Turismo Sport, Nike - "Never Not Part 2", Jetman - "Young Feathers", Red Bull - "The Fourth Phase", HBO's Cries from Syria, and the Ty Evans-directed "The Flat Earth", "We Are Blood", "The Last Maniac", and "Unbeleafable 3D".

Bleitch
Baron is one-half of electronic pop band Bleitch with Madelyn Deutch. The band released their debut single "This Is Our Youth" in July 2014 and their follow-up single "Paint By Numbers" in May 2015.

Discography

Singles (as Piers Baron)
 2018 - "Planet Phatt" (music from The Flat Earth - original motion picture soundtrack)
 2018 - "Leap of Faith"
 2017 - "Majesty" (music from The Flat Earth - original motion picture soundtrack)
 2017 - "Broken" (music from The Flat Earth - original motion picture soundtrack)
 2017 - "The Light Will Follow Us"
 2017 - "Lost Souls Make It"
 2017 - "Sentinel"
 2016 - "Race to Be Human"
 2016 - "The Last Night on Earth"
 2015 - "As Our Witness"
 2015 - "Cold Call"
 2014 - "Underwater Universe"

Soundtracks (as Piers Baron)
2020 - Accomplice by Teton Gravity Research (original soundtrack composer)
2017 - The Flat Earth by Ghost Digital Cinema (original soundtrack composer)
2017 - Cries from Syria by HBO (credits song producer w/ Diane Warren & Cher)
2017 - Gran Turismo Sport by Sony (original soundtrack composer)
2016 - The Fourth Phase by Red Bull (original soundtrack composer)
2016 - The Last Maniac by Ghost Digital Cinema (original soundtrack composer)
2015 - Gran Turismo Sport by Sony (original soundtrack composer)
2015 - We Are Blood by Brainfarm (original soundtrack composer)
2015 - Jetman Young Feathers by X Dubai (original soundtrack composer)
2013 - Never Not Part 2 by Nike (original soundtrack composer)

Live
2017/18 - David Blaine Live (original soundtrack composer)

Production
2019 - Maejor - "Nirvana" - (co-wrote and produced)
2017 - Cher - "Prayers For This World" - music from HBO's Cries From Syria (produced)
2017 - Robbie Williams - "Eyes on The Highway" (co-wrote, produced and mixed)
2017 - Robbie Williams - "Bambi" (co-wrote, produced and mixed)
2017 - Robbie Williams - "International Entertainment" (co-wrote, produced and mixed)

Singles (with Bleitch)
2014 - "This is Our Youth" (co-wrote, produced and mixed)
2015 - "Paint by Numbers" (co-wrote, produced and mixed)
2015 - "Crime" (co-wrote, produced and mixed)
2015 - "Speaking of Moments" (co-wrote, produced and mixed)

Singles (with Maize)
2016 - "Remember to Lose"
2016 - "Out to Find Love"
2016 - "I Like You"

Remixes (with Maize)
2015 - Marina and the Diamonds - "Blue" (MAIZE) remix
2015 - MS MR - "Criminals" (MAIZE) remix
2015 - Gwen Stefani - "Used to Love You" (MAIZE) remix
2016 - Alex Newell - "Basically Over You" (MAIZE) remix
2016 - All Saints - "This is a War" (MAIZE) remix

Drum and bass (as Baron)
"The Way It Was" / "Redhead" UKDance No. 2
"Supernature" (with Fresh) UKDance No. 3
'Guns at Dawn" (with Pendulum) UKDance No. 3
"At The Drive In" / "Decade" UKDance No. 3
"Drive In, Drive By" / "St. Elmo" UKDance No. 1
"Endless Summer" / "Dr. Agnostic" UKDance No. 3
"Turn up the Sun" / "Blinking with Fists" UKDance No. 4

References

1983 births
Living people
English record producers
People from Brackley